William Degouve de Nuncques (also Nunques) was a Belgian painter, born 28 February 1867 and died 1 March 1935. He was associated with the symbolist movement although he is occasionally referred to as a postimpressionist. He is best known for his nocturnal landscapes, inundated with strange atmosphere and at times visionary subjects. He continued to paint compelling landscapes into the early decades of the 20th century but the overt symbolist qualities slowly dissipated from his work after 1900.

Life 
He was born at Monthermé, the Ardennes, France, of an old aristocratic family, After the Franco-Prussian war (1870–71), his parents settled in Belgium. Art historian Robert Delevoy wrote that he inherited a strong personality and a passion for spirituality from his father, "and when still young he showed a tendency to indulge in spleen, reverie, and contemplation, instead of action." He briefly enrolled in the Brussels Academy but, he soon left without completing his studies and largely taught himself to paint. He met the Dutch artist Jan Toorop in 1883 and a strong friendship developed. Degouve de Nuncques shared a studio with Jan Toorop, and later with Henry de Groux, and these two artist are said to have had a significant influence on his early development. In 1894 he married fellow artist Juliette Massin, who introduced him to the circle of Symbolist poets, who had a considerable influence on his style. He belonged to the avant-garde group Les XX and later exhibited at La Libre Esthétique. He travelled widely and painted views of Italy, Austria and France, often of parks at night. He designed the sets for Maurice Maeterlinck's play Interior (1895).

From 1900 to 1902 he and his wife lived in the Balearic Islands, where he painted the rugged coastline and the orange groves. After suffering a religious crisis around 1910, he painted pictures that revealed his tormented state of mind, and during World War I, while a refugee in the Netherlands, he produced only minor works. In 1919 he was overwhelmed by the death of his wife and lost the use of one hand. In 1930 he married the woman who had helped him through the crisis. They settled in Stavelot, where he spent his last few years painting snow-covered landscapes.

Art 
He is supposed to have said "To make a painting, all you need to do is to take some paints, draw some lines, and fill the rest up with feelings."  A regular exhibitor in Paris, he was championed by Puvis de Chavannes and Maurice Denis.

His best-known pictures, The Blind House [aka The Pink House] (1892), The Angels (1894), and Peacocks (1896), demonstrate the magical quality of his work. The Blind House is thought to have been an influence on the Surrealist, especially the paintings of René Magritte and his series The Empire of Lights.

The largest collection of his paintings, with over 20 oils and pastels, as well as prints and drawings, is in the Kröller-Müller Museum, Otterlo.

Gallery

References

A catalogue raisonné of his works is in preparation, see www.catalogueraisonne.eu.

1867 births
1935 deaths
People from Ardennes (department)
Belgian Symbolist painters
19th-century Belgian painters
19th-century Belgian male artists
20th-century Belgian painters
20th-century Belgian male artists